A sports riot is a riot that occurs during or after sporting events. Sports riots occur worldwide. Most riots are known to occur after the event is done, but some have been during the game (see football hooliganism). Whilst football (soccer) is one of the more well-known triggers for riots, other sports which have triggered riots include ice hockey and motorcycle racing. There are a number of factors believed to influence whether riots occur, including cultural factors; environmental factors such as temperature, darkness, and noise; and witnessing player violence.

Examples

The following are various examples of a sports riot:

References

 
Riots